Michael Richard Lah (September 1, 1912 – October 13, 1995) was an American animator of Slovene origin. He is best remembered for his work at the Metro-Goldwyn-Mayer cartoon studio, primarily as a member of Tex Avery's animation unit. He first worked on Tom and Jerry shorts before going to work on Droopy/Tex Avery shorts.

Early life and career 
Lah was born in Illinois. He worked briefly at Walt Disney Studios before joining MGM in the late 1930s. His first work at MGM was in the Harman-Ising unit, working on the final Happy Harmonies cartoon, The Little Bantamweight in 1938. He then joined Tex Avery's unit as lead animator, where he remained until the studio closed in 1957, directing a handful of cartoons with Preston Blair in the late 1940s before becoming a full-time director in 1953 after Avery left the studio, and Michael Lah and Tex Avery both co-directed some shorts before Avery's departure.

After he left MGM, he briefly rejoined Hanna-Barbera at their television cartoon studio as an animator on The Flintstones and various other shows, then joined Quartet Films, a commercial animation studio that created television commercials for Kelloggs and Green Giant Foods.

He was an active member of ASIFA-Hollywood, serving on the board for several years. In 1984, Lah received the Winsor McCay Award for his lifetime of work in the animation field.

Personal life and death 
He was married to Alberta Wogatzke, the twin sister of Violet Wogatzke (William Hanna's wife). Lah died on October 13, 1995, in Los Angeles, California.

References

External links 

Michael Lah animation sketches from ASIFA-Hollywood Animation Archive

1912 births
1995 deaths
American animators
American animated film directors
Hanna-Barbera people
Metro-Goldwyn-Mayer cartoon studio people
American people of Slovenian descent